The 1998–99 Santosh Trophy was the 55th edition of the Santosh Trophy, the main State competition for football in India. It was held between 25 March and 4 April 1999 in Tamil Nadu, India. In the final, Bengal beat Goa 1–0 in a repeat of the previous edition's final. It was Bengal's sixth consecutive title and 29th overall.

Group stage

Cluster I

Cluster II

Cluster III

Cluster IV

Knockout stage

Semi-finals

Final

References

External links 
 

1998–99 in Indian football
Santosh Trophy seasons